The mayor of Boston is the head of the municipal government in Boston, Massachusetts. Boston has a mayor–council government. Boston's mayoral elections are nonpartisan (as are all municipal elections in Boston), and elect a mayor to a four-year term; there are no term limits. The mayor's office is in Boston City Hall, in Government Center.

The current mayor of Boston is Michelle Wu.

History
In Massachusetts, a town is typically governed by a town meeting, with a board of selectmen handling regular business. Boston was the first community in Massachusetts to receive a city charter, which was granted in 1822. Under the terms of the new charter, the mayor was elected annually. In June 1895, the charter was amended, and the mayor's term was increased to two years.

In 1909, the Republican-controlled state legislature enacted strong-mayor charter changes it hoped would dampen the rising power of Democratic Irish Americans. Adopted by public vote in the November 1909 general election, changes included extending the mayoral term to four years, and making the post formally non-partisan. The reforms did not work; the first mayor elected under the new charter was Democrat John F. Fitzgerald ("Honey Fitz"), and every mayor since Republican Malcolm Nichols (1926–1930) has been known to be a Democrat.

In a bid to temper the rising power of James Michael Curley, the state legislature in 1918 passed legislation barring the Mayor of Boston from serving consecutive terms in office; Curley was prevented from running for re-election twice by this law (November 1925 and November 1933). The law was repealed in 1939, after Curley's political career appeared to be in decline.

Another charter change was enacted in 1949, partly in response to Curley's fourth term (1946–1950), during which he served prison time for crimes committed in an earlier term. Changes included adding a preliminary election to narrow the field to two mayoral candidates in advance of the general election, changing the Boston City Council from having 22 members (one from each city ward) to having nine members (elected at-large), and giving the council ability to override some mayoral vetoes. These changes went into effect in 1951, resulting in the first term of John B. Hynes being shortened to two years.

From 1951 through 1991, Boston mayoral elections were held the year before presidential elections (e.g. mayoral election in 1951, presidential election in 1952). Starting in 1993, due to the election held following Raymond Flynn's appointment as United States Ambassador to the Holy See, Boston mayoral elections are held the year following presidential elections (e.g. presidential election in 1992, mayoral election in 1993).

Salary
In June 2018, the Council voted to increase the salary of the mayor to $207,000, effective after the mayoral election of November 2021 (term starting in January 2022); this increased the salary of councillors to $103,500, effective after the council elections of November 2019 (terms starting in January 2020). In October 2022, the Council voted to increase the salary of the mayor to $250,000.

List
There is no official count of Boston's mayors. The City of Boston does not number its mayors and numbering has been inconsistent over time. For example, Thomas Menino was referred to as the 47th mayor at the time he was sworn in, yet his successor, Marty Walsh, was identified as the 54th. The Walsh administration cited Wikipedia for its use of 54. That numbering scheme counted persons who served as elected mayors and counted those who served non-consecutive terms more than once; James M. Curley served four non-consecutive terms and was counted four times. Kim Janey, who became acting mayor in March 2021, refers to herself as the 55th mayor.

 died in office
 acting mayor only
 Native American Party and American Party were formal names of the "Know Nothing" movement.

Acting mayors
Boston's city charter stipulates that the City Council President serves as acting mayor whenever the mayor is absent from the city, unable to serve, or the office is vacant.   An acting mayor cannot make permanent appointments, and can only perform urgent tasks "not admitting of delay" (which is somewhat open to interpretation).

The following individuals served as acting mayor during a vacancy in the office.

See also
 Timeline of Boston
 List of elections in Massachusetts
 List of members of Boston City Council
 List of mayors of Roxbury, Massachusetts
 List of mayors of Charlestown, Massachusetts
 List of mayors of the 50 largest cities in the United States

Notes

Sources

References

Further reading

External links

 Lists of Mayors of Boston at The Political Graveyard

 
1822 establishments in Massachusetts
Mayors of Boston
Government of Boston
Boston